State Road 83 (NM 83) is a state highway in the US state of New Mexico. NM 83's western terminus is at U.S. Route 82 (US 82) / NM 18 in Lovington, and the eastern terminus is at NM 132 north of Hobbs.

Major intersections

See also

References

083
Transportation in Lea County, New Mexico